Paiva is a Portuguese family surname, of toponymic origin in Paiva, today Castelo de Paiva, Portugal.

It may refer to:

People
Adriano de Paiva (1847–1907), Portuguese scientist, a pioneer of the telectroscope
Afonso de Paiva (-), Portuguese diplomat and explorer of Ethiopia
Antonia Maury (Antonia Caetana de Paiva Pereira Maury, 1866-1952), American astronomer
Bueno de Paiva (1861-1928), Brazilian politician
Diego Andrada de Payva (Diogo de Paiva de Andrada, 1528–75), Portuguese theologian
Félix Paiva (1877-1965), President of Paraguay
Esther Paiva (1819-1884), Russian-born French courtesan and salon-holder
Bueno de Paiva (Francisco Álvaro Bueno de Paiva, 1861-1928), Vice-President of Brazil
Heliodoro de Paiva, Portuguese Renaissance composer
Henrique Mitchell de Paiva Couceiro (1861-1944), Portuguese military officer, statesman, and politician
James DePaiva (born 1957), American actor
João Soares de Paiva ( – after 1200/16), Portuguese troubadour
José Pinto Paiva (born 1938), Brazilian chess master 
Juliana Paiva (born 1993), Brazilian actress
Kassie DePaiva (born 1961), American soap opera actress and singer
Loick Pires (Loick Barros Paiva Pires, born 1989), Portuguese footballer playing in the UK
Nestor Paiva (1905–66), American actor
Ricardo Tavarelli (Ricardo Javier Tavarelli Paiva, born 1970), Paraguayan footballer

Places

Brazil
Paiva, Minas Gerais, a municipality
Engenheiro Rubens Paiva, a station on the underground railway system of Rio de Janeiro
Estádio José Duarte de Paiva, a multi-use stadium in Sete Lagoas
Estádio Gustavo Paiva, a multi-use stadium in Maceió

Portugal
Castelo de Paiva, a town
Castelo de Paiva Municipality
Vila Nova de Paiva, a municipality
Paiva River, a river in north-east Portugal (a tributary of the river Douro)

Uruguay
Estadio Atilio Paiva Olivera, a multi-use stadium in Rivera, Uruguay

Other uses
Paiva (plant genus), a former genus in the family Rubiaceae

Portuguese-language surnames